How Do I Become a Film Star? (German: Wie werde ich Filmstar?) is a 1955 West German musical comedy film directed by Theo Lingen and starring Nadja Tiller, Harald Juhnke and Bibi Johns.

It was shot at the Wandsbek Studios in Hamburg. The film's sets were designed by the art director Dieter Bartels and Herbert Kirchhoff.

Cast
 Nadja Tiller as Marianne Krause
 Harald Juhnke as Günther Scholz
 Bibi Johns as Brigitte Lenz
 Peter Garden as Fritz Neumann
 Ruth Stephan as Elli May
 Oskar Sima as Willi Glaser
 Theo Lingen as Paul Kubisch
 Mona Baptiste as Mona Grandez
 Carl Voscherauas Vater Lenz
 Carl-Heinz Schroth as Regisseur Altmann
 Bully Buhlan as Kurt Hampel
 Agnes Windeck as Frau von Klagemann
 Ilja Glusgal as Geschäftsführer
 Peter Hinnen as Waldi

References

Bibliography
 Bock, Hans-Michael & Bergfelder, Tim. The Concise CineGraph. Encyclopedia of German Cinema. Berghahn Books, 2009.

External links 
 

1955 films
1955 musical comedy films
German musical comedy films
West German films
1950s German-language films
Films directed by Theo Lingen
German black-and-white films
Films about filmmaking
Films shot at Wandsbek Studios
1950s German films